Spartina is a taxon of plants in the grass family, frequently found in coastal salt marshes. Its species are commonly known as cordgrass or cord-grass, and are native to the coasts of the Atlantic Ocean in western and southern Europe, north-western and southern Africa, the Americas and the islands of the southern Atlantic Ocean; one or two species also occur on the western coast of North America and in freshwater habitats inland in the Americas. The highest species diversity is on the east coasts of North and South America, particularly Florida. They form large, often dense colonies, particularly on coastal salt marshes, and grow quickly. The species vary in size from 0.3–2 m tall. Many of the species will produce hybrids if they come into contact.

Taxonomy
In 2014, the taxon Spartina was subsumed into the genus Sporobolus and reassigned to the taxonomic status of section, but it is may still be possible to see Spartina referred to as an accepted genus. In 2019, an interdisciplinary team of experts from all continents (except for Antarctica) coauthored a report published in the journal Ecology supporting Spartina as a genus.

Species
The following species are recognised in the section Spartina:
Subsection Alterniflori P.M.Peterson & Saarela
 Sporobolus alterniflorus  – smooth cordgrass – Atlantic coasts of North and South America, West Indies
 Sporobolus anglicus (C.E.Hubb.) P.M.Peterson & Saarela - Great Britain, introduced to Europe, China, Australia, New Zealand, and North America
 Sporobolus foliosus  – California cordgrass – California, Baja California, Baja California Sur
 Sporobolus longispicus  – Argentina, Uruguay
 Sporobolus maritimus (Curtis) P.M.Peterson & Saarela - Europe, Africa
 Sporobolus × townsendii  – Townsend's cordgrass – western Europe
Subsection Ponceletia (Thouars) P.M.Peterson & Saarela
 Sporobolus arundinacea (Thouars) Carmich – Tristan da Cunha, Amsterdam Island in Indian Ocean
 Sporobolus mobberleyanus P.M.Peterson & Saarela – Tristan da Cunha, Amsterdam Island in Indian Ocean
 Sporobolus spartinae  – Gulf cordgrass – Atlantic coast of North America from Florida to Argentina, incl the Caribbean and the Gulf of Mexico
Subsection Spartina (Schreb) P.M.Peterson & Saarela
 Sporobolus bakeri  – sand cordgrass – south-eastern US
 Sporobolus coarctatus  – Brazil, Argentina, Uruguay
 Sporobolus cynosuroides  – big cordgrass – eastern US (TX to MA); Bahamas
 Sporobolus × eatonianus  – eastern North America
 Sporobolus hookerianus  – alkali cordgrass – western Canada, western + central US, Chihuahua, Jalisco, Michoacán
 Sporobolus michauxianus  – prairie cordgrass – from Northwest Territories to Texas and Newfoundland
 Sporobolus montevidensis  – denseflower cordgrass – Venezuela, Brazil, Argentina, Uruguay, Chile
 Sporobolus pumilus  – saltmeadow cordgrass – east coast of North America from Labrador to Tamaulipas; West Indies
 Sporobolus versicolor  – Mediterranean, Azores

Ecology
Species of the section Spartina are used as food plants by the larvae of some Lepidoptera species including the Aaron's skipper, which feeds exclusively on smooth cordgrass, and the engrailed moth.

Some species of the section Spartina are considered as ecosystem engineers that can strongly influence the physical and biological environment. This is particularly important in areas where invasive Spartina species significantly alter their new environment, with impacts to native plants and animals.

As an invasive species
Three of the Spartina species have become invasive plants in some countries. In British Columbia, Sporobolus anglica, also known as English cordgrass, is an aggressive, aquatic alien that invades mud flats, salt marshes and beaches, out-competing native plants, spreading quickly over mud flats and leaving large Spartina meadows. It is also invasive in China and California.

Sporobolus montevidensis and Sporobolus pumilus have become invasive on the Iberian Peninsula and the west coast of the United States

Sporobolus alterniflorus and its hybrids with other Spartina species are invasive in numerous locations around the globe, including China, California, England, France, and Spain.

Cultivation
Species of the section Spartina have been planted to reclaim estuarine areas for farming, to supply fodder for livestock, and to prevent erosion. Various members of the genus (especially Sporobolus alterniflorus and its derivatives, Sporobolus anglicus and Sporobolus × townsendii) have spread outside of their native boundaries and become invasive.

Big cordgrass (S. cynosuroides) is used in the construction of bull's eye targets for sports archery.  A properly constructed target can stop an arrow safely without damage to the arrowhead as it lodges in the target.

References

 
Halophytes
Grasses of Africa
Grasses of Europe
Grasses of North America
Grasses of South America